Travellerspoint is a travel and social networking site for people who want to learn from or share experiences with other travellers.  Members of the site participate through forums, blogs, photo galleries and a wiki travel guide, similar to Wikivoyage.

Features
Forums: members discuss their travel experiences in several destination and topic related forums.
Travel guide: a custom built wiki in which users can edit information to help assist potential visitors; contributors are able to share in the revenue from advertising, or opt to use their share to lend through Kiva.
Blogs: an integrated blogging system allowing users to post content to their own Travellerspoint subdomain.
Photography: users can upload unlimited photos of their trips; the best photos are manually featured and displayed throughout the site.
Maps: a mapping system that allows users to plot their trip's itinerary on a world map.  It is interlinked with the photos and blogs.  A user's map integrates their photography and blog entries through geotagging.  In March 2007, Travellerspoint travel maps were nominated in the category of 'Best Use of Social Media' for the Travolution Awards.
Travel planner: a travel planning tool that integrates with the above mapping tool; allows the planning of future trips and collaboration with other members.
Travel helpers: an early addition to the Travellerspoint set of services was a Travel Helper system, which allowed members to sign up as travel helpers for any number of countries.  There are currently over 3000 travel helpers.

See also
List of social networking websites

References

Australian travel websites
Wiki communities
Internet properties established in 2002